Soncin was a French automobile constructed by Louis Soncin and manufactured between 1900 and 1902.  A two-seat 4½ hp voiturette, it was the forerunner of the Grégoire.  A Soncin raced by Henri François Béconnais set the 1 km speed record (48 seconds) on September 21, 1899 at Achères,</ref> and the speed record of   driving a Soncin at the «Semaine de Nice» on March 30, 1900.  It was a frequently used racing vehicle of the days, such as in the Paris-Toulouse-Paris in July 1900, and  a tricycle raced by L. Gastè won races at Targa Rignano (1900 and 1901).  A Soncin 10 hp won the Coppa Brescia on September 10, 1900.

Specially-tuned Soncin engines were also used by Chase Brothers Motorcycle company.

References

Defunct motor vehicle manufacturers of France